KV Arena is an indoor sporting arena located in Karlovy Vary, Czech Republic, built in 2009. The maximum capacity of the arena is 7,500 people, or 5,874 seating people for ice hockey matches. It is currently home to the HC Energie Karlovy Vary ice hockey team.

KV Arena comprises 4 interconnecting halls: Multi-purpose Hall (Main Hall), Training Hall, Ball Sports Hall and Swimming Pool.

External links
Official site

Indoor ice hockey venues in the Czech Republic
Sport in Karlovy Vary
Buildings and structures in the Karlovy Vary Region
2009 establishments in the Czech Republic
Sports venues completed in 2009
21st-century architecture in the Czech Republic